Iron Wall may refer to:

 Iron Wall (essay), by Ze'ev Jabotinsky, 1923
 Iron Wall (film),  2006 
The Iron Wall: Zionist Revisionism from Jabotinsky to Shamir, a 1984 book by Lenni Brenner

See also
 
 Iron Curtain, a 20th century political boundary in Europe
 K-W Line, a World War 2 defence line in Belgium